Damien Brunner (born March 9, 1986) is a Swiss professional ice hockey forward currently playing with EHC Biel of the National League (NL). He has also played in the National Hockey League for the Detroit Red Wings and the New Jersey Devils.

Playing career
 Brunner was born in Kloten, Switzerland, on March 9, 1986. As a youth, he played in the 1999 and 2000 Quebec International Pee-Wee Hockey Tournaments with a team from Zürich.

He played for the Kloten Flyers of the National League A in 2006–07 and 2007–08. In 2008–09, he moved to EV Zug. In 2011–12, Brunner had 60 points in 45 games. He led the NLA in points and was named the league's forward of the year.

On July 1, 2012, Brunner signed a one-year entry-level contract with the Detroit Red Wings of the NHL. He then returned to EV Zug for the 2012–13 season until the 2012–13 NHL lockout was resolved, where he started the shortened season with the Red Wings. He netted the game-winning shootout goal against the Columbus Blue Jackets, in his second game with the Red Wings.  He scored his first NHL goal the next day against Kari Lehtonen of the Dallas Stars.

Brunner played in the 2010 IIHF World Championship as a member of the Switzerland men's national ice hockey team.

After turning down two and three-year contract offers from the Detroit Red Wings, Brunner became an Unrestricted Free Agent. On September 16, 2013 he was signed by the New Jersey Devils on a pro tryout contract and attended the team's training camp.  On September 24, 2013, he was signed by the New Jersey Devils to a two-year, $5 million contract.

On December 5, 2014, the Devils placed Brunner on waivers after he was benched for the entire third period in a 5-3 win against the Toronto Maple Leafs on December 4. He cleared waivers the following day. He had 2 goals and 5 assists in 17 games. With little interest in playing in the American Hockey League, Brunner agreed to mutually terminate his contract with the Devils and on December 12, 2014, he returned to Switzerland where he signed a five-year contract with HC Lugano worth CHF 6 million.

Near the end of the 2017–18 regular season, Brunner broke his leg, forcing him to sit out the end of the regular season as well as the playoffs.

On May 19, 2018, Brunner and HC Lugano parted ways -with one year remaining on his contract- and immediately signed a two-year deal worth CHF 2 million with EHC Biel.

On August 26, 2019, Brunner was signed to an early three-year contract extension by Biel through the 2022–23 season.

Career statistics

Regular season and playoffs

International

References

External links

1986 births
Living people
Detroit Red Wings players
EHC Biel players
EHC Bülach players
EV Zug players
HC Lugano players
HC Thurgau players
Ice hockey players at the 2014 Winter Olympics
EHC Kloten players
New Jersey Devils players
Olympic ice hockey players of Switzerland
Swiss expatriate sportspeople in the United States
Swiss ice hockey left wingers
Undrafted National Hockey League players
People from Bülach District
Sportspeople from the canton of Zürich